Darling is a 1965 British romantic drama film directed by John Schlesinger from a screenplay written by Frederic Raphael. It stars Julie Christie as Diana Scott, a young successful model and actress in Swinging London, toying with the affections of two older men, played by Dirk Bogarde and Laurence Harvey. The film was shot on-location in London, Paris and Rome and at Shepperton Studios by cinematographer Kenneth Higgins, with a musical score composed by Sir John Dankworth.

The film premiered at the 4th Moscow International Film Festival on July 16, 1965, and was released theatrically in the United Kingdom on September 16 by Anglo-Amalgamated. It became a critical and commercial success, grossing $4.5 million and received five nominations at the 38th Academy Awards, including Best Picture, and won in three categories: Best Actress (for Christie), Best Original Screenplay, and Best Costume Design. It also won four BAFTA Awards: Best British Actor (Bogarde), Best British Actress (Christie), Best British Screenplay and Best Art Direction (Black-and-White).

Plot 

Diana Scott is a beautiful, bored young model married to Tony Bridges. One day, Diana meets Robert Gold, a literary interviewer/director for television arts programs, by chance when she is spotted on the street by his roving film crew and interviewed by him about young people's views on convention. Diana is invited to watch the final edit in the TV studio, and it's there that their relationship starts. After liaisons in bleak hotel rooms, they leave their spouses (and, in Robert's case, children) and move into an apartment.

As a couple, they become part of the fashionable London media/arts set. Initially, Diana is jealous when Robert sees his wife while visiting his children, but she quickly loses this attachment when she mixes with the males of the media, arts, and advertising scene, particularly Miles Brand, a powerful advertising executive for the Glass Corporation who gets her a part in a trashy thriller after she has sex with him. The bookish Robert prefers the quiet life; it is he who now becomes jealous, but increasingly detached, depressed and lonely.

Diana attends a high-class charity draw for world hunger for which she is the face. The event, adorned by giant images of African famine victims is juxtaposed with wealthy guests behaving decadently and gorging themselves with food. Diana later becomes pregnant and decides to have an abortion to sustain her career.

She flies to Paris with Miles for more jet-set sophistication. There she finds the wild party, beat music, strip dance mind game, and cross-dressing vaguely repellent, but slowly adjusts and holds her own, gaining the respect of the crowd when she taunts Miles during the game. On her return to London, Robert calls her a whore upon discovering her affair with Miles and leaves her, for which she is not emotionally prepared. Miles, then, casts her as "The Happiness Girl" in the Glass Corporation's advertising campaign for a chocolate firm.

Diana finds comfort in the company of gay photographer Malcolm who has created her new famous look. They go shopping, where she randomly decides to shoplift multiple items. On location at a palazzo near Rome, Diana smiles in her medieval/Renaissance costume and completes "The Happiness Girl" shoot. She is taken with the beauty of the building and the landscape, getting on well with the prince, Cesare, who owns the palazzo. With the friendly Malcolm, Diana decides to stay in Italy. They stay in a simple house by a small harbor in Capri, where Diana flirts half-heartedly with Catholicism. They are visited by Cesare, who arrives at a huge launch, invites them on board, and proposes to Diana. She politely declines his proposal, but Cesare leaves the offer open.

Diana returns to London, still living in the flat she shared with Robert, where she has a party with Miles and other assorted media characters. Robert comes by to visit Diana but sees that she's with Miles and departs. Becoming disillusioned with Miles and the vacuous London jet set, Diana flirts with the Catholic church again. Impulsively, she flies to Italy and marries the prince, which proves to be ill-fated. Though waited on hand and foot by the servants, she is almost immediately abandoned in the vast palazzo by Cesare, who visits Rome frequently.

Diana flees to London to visit Robert, who charms her into bed, making her believe they are ready for a stable, long-term relationship. However, in the morning, he tells her that he's leaving her and that he fooled her only as an act of revenge. He reserves a flight to Rome, packs her into his car, and takes her to Heathrow airport to send her back to her life as Princess Della Romita. At the airport, Diana is hounded by the press, who address her as Princess. She boards the plane to leave.

Cast

Production
According to Richard Gregson, agent for John Schlesinger, the budget was around £300,000 and was entirely provided by Nat Cohen at Anglo-Amalgamated.

Shirley MacLaine originally was cast as Diana, but was replaced by Christie. Production on Darling commenced in August 1964 and wrapped in December. It was filmed on location in London, Paris, and Rome. The Romita palazzo was portrayed by the Medici villa. The final scene was shot at Heathrow Airport in London.

In 1971, New York magazine wrote of mod fashion and its wearers: "This new, déclassé English girl was epitomized by Julie Christie in Darling—amoral, rootless, emotionally immature, and apparently irresistible."

Reception
Despite receiving many awards at the time of release, the film later developed a mixed reputation. In his New Biographical Dictionary of Film entry on Schlesinger, David Thomson writes that the film "deserves a place in every archive to show how rapidly modishness withers. Beauty is central to the cinema and Schlesinger seems an unreliable judge of it, over-rating Christie and rarely getting close enough to the action to make a fruitful stylistic bond with it". Leonard Maltin's Movie Guide described it as a "trendy, influential '60s film – in flashy form and cynical content". Tony Rayns though, in the Time Out Film Guide, is as damning as Thomson. For him, the film is a "leaden rehash of ideas from Godard, Antonioni and Bergman", although with nods to the "Royal Court school", which "now looks grotesquely pretentious and out of touch with the realities of the life-styles that it purports to represent."

On the review aggregator website Rotten Tomatoes, Darling holds an approval rating of 67% from 18 reviews, with an average rating of 7.1/10.

Box office
The film was a commercial success, grossing $12 million at the worldwide box office against a budget of only £400,000. It earned $4 million in theatrical rentals.

According to Richard Gregson, the film only earned £250,000 in the United Kingdom, but Nat Cohen sold the U.S. rights to Joe E. Levine for $900,000 and made a profit – and the film was more successful in the U.S.

Accolades

See also
 BFI Top 100 British films

References

External links
 
 
 
 
 

1965 films
1960s British films
1960s English-language films
1965 romantic drama films
British black-and-white films
British romantic drama films
Films about fashion in the United Kingdom
Films about modeling
Films directed by John Schlesinger
Films featuring a Best Actress Academy Award-winning performance
Films scored by John Dankworth
Films set in London
Films set in Paris
Films set in Rome
Films shot in London
Films shot in Paris
Films shot in Rome
Films shot in Tuscany
Films that won the Best Costume Design Academy Award
Films whose writer won the Best Original Screenplay Academy Award